David Carl Mann (June 2, 1932 – May 22, 2012) was an American professional gridiron football punter in the NFL and CFL. Mann was also the first African-American to play college football for Oregon State University.

Career – College to NFL to CFL
Born in Berkeley, California, Mann played at Oregon State from 1951 to 1954 and was drafted in the 7th round of the 1954 NFL Draft by the Chicago Cardinals in the National Football League.  He played for the Cardinals for three seasons as a punter, running back, and a special teams member. Then he went to the Canadian Football League where he played for the Toronto Argonauts. On the eve of the 1959 season, Mann was arrested after a raid on his apartment discovered about $100 worth of marijuana. Although he was acquitted at trial in February 1960, the Argonauts elected not to play him pending the outcome of the trial, forcing Mann to sit out the whole 1959 season. When released in the start of the 1969 season, he played for the Bramalea Satellites, being called back to the Argos as if the Bramalea team was a taxi squad.

Dave Mann volunteered as Offence Coach with St. Michael's College at the University of Toronto, under head coach Lex Byrd.  During Mann's tenure, the team won four Mulock Cups as intra-collegiate football champions; including the final playing of intra-faculty tackle football at U of T in the fall of 1993.

Personal, Post Football and Death
Mann became a Canadian citizen and moved to Mississauga, Ontario, where instructed techniques in golf, played drums in a jazz trio and became friends with comedian Bill Cosby. He also became a partner with Archie Alleyne, John Henry Jackson and Howard Matthews in The Underground Railroad, a soul food restaurant in Toronto.

Mann died on May 22, 2012 in a Toronto nursing home due to complications from dementia.

References

External links
NFL.com player page
Dave Mann listed as All-time Argo

1932 births
2012 deaths
Sportspeople from Berkeley, California
American players of Canadian football
American football punters
American football running backs
Canadian football placekickers
Canadian football punters
Oregon State Beavers football players
Chicago Cardinals players
Toronto Argonauts players
American emigrants to Canada
Deaths from dementia in Canada
Players of American football from Berkeley, California
African-American players of Canadian football
Black Canadian players of Canadian football
Canadian restaurateurs
African-American players of American football